Startup Thailand is a national startup promotion platform implemented to support and encourage startup growth and startup ecosystem in Thailand leading by the Ministry of Science and Technology (MOST) of Thailand. The policy is initiated by National Startup Committee (NSC) in supporting startup activities in Thailand. In Thailand, Startup is viewed as New Economic Warrior (NEW) as it is the new energy is driving national economy. Thailand aims to position itself as a nation with science- and innovation-driven economy has established a national level policy to make Thailand as an open area for startup in Asia region.

NSC is appointed by General Prayuth Chan-ocha, the Prime Minister to establish grand strategy for startup support and building of startup ecosystem in Thailand in 2016, administrated by MOST. The committee is chaired by the Permanent Secretary of Finance and composed of representatives from related organizations and agencies. The main objective of this committee is to mobilize government agencies related to startup support in order to realize the startup promotion plan from this committee. There are four working groups under NSC:

 Awareness and Communication Working group led by National Innovation Agency (NIA) 
 Infrastructure for Startup Support Working Group led by Science Innovation and Technology Strategy Planning Agency (STI) 
 Incubation of Startup Working Group led by National Science and Technology Development Agency (NSTDA) 
 Policy and Regulation Recommendation Working Group led by Fiscal Policy Office, Ministry of Finance (FPO)

Awareness and Public Understanding
 Creating public awareness and understanding on startup through annual Startup Thailand event, media and community networks

Entrepreneurial Ecosystem Development
Building up entrepreneurship through 3 following projects
 Startup Thailand Academy: Entrepreneurship course development in university as policy of developing university into “Entrepreneurial University” with cooperation of 30 universities nationwide
 Startup Thailand Launchpads: Development of Startup District by creating co-working space in 30 universities nationwide
 Startup Thailand League: Developing idea to new innovative business (startup) with target of 550 prototype funding projects

Ecosystem and Sectorial Development
Developing 9 target sectors of startup and ecosystem
 GovTech/EdTech
 AgriTech/Food Startup
 MedTech/HealthTech
 FinTech
 IndustryTech
 TravelTech
 LifeStyle
 E-commerce/Logistics
 PropertyTech

Startup Regionalization
Supporting startup in regional level; MOST has startup incubator in 3 main regions at the moment.
 Northern Innovative Startup Thailand
 Deepsouth Startup Thailand
 Eastern Economic Corridor Startup Thailand

Startup Thailand Connect
Building up network of startups and accelerating the capability of Thai startups for global expansion through 4 following projects
 Global Acceleration Program: Accelerator with cooperation of international partner to build up Thai startup's capability for global competition and opportunities, was recently successfully finished with cooperation with Israeli investors in accelerating Thai startups for global market.
 Business Brotherhood: Development of 10 private research and development centers for supporting new innovative business for the purpose of establishment of collaboration between university and large corporate in developing startups in their specific fields
 Startups in Residence: Recruitment of organization/agency that has expertise and ready to mentor startup including co-working space for holding networking events for startups, community and local agencies
 Incubator Development: Developing incubator for startups in Thailand

Innovation District
characteristic of the area and organizations in the district in the suitable way for startup incubation (within 4 km2)
 Bangkok Innovation Corridor: Yothi, Saim, Khlong San, Kluay Nam Thai, Huai Khwang and Lad Krabang
 EEC Innovation Corridor: Pattaya, Sri Racha, Bang Saen and Utah Pao
 Innovation Constellation: Regional innovation district which are Chiang Mai, Khon Kaen and Phuket

Startup Database and Impact Assessment
Collection and analysis of startup data in Thailand for strategic planning and foresight

Ease of Doing Business
Assisting startup in doing business by adjusting laws and regulations for startup to do business at ease by first set up timeframe for data implementing in order to assess the impact and if the outcome is successful, the recommendation for law and regulation adjustment will be submitted for example the following rights in the stock market
 Employee stock option
 Convertible debt
 Amortization of Stock-based Compensation

References

Government programmes of Thailand
Economy of Thailand